Erika Simon (27 June 1927 – 15 February 2019) was a German scholar of classical archaeology and professor emeritus of the University of Würzburg. She was elected to the American Philosophical Society in 2002. Simon died in February 2019 at the age of 91.

Selected writings
 1968 Ara Pacis Augustae
 1969 The Gods of the Greek (Hirmer, Munich)
 1983 Festivals of Attica: an Archaeological Commentary
 2006 The Religion of the Etruscans (co-editor with Nancy Thomson de Grummond)

References

Further reading
Writings in her honor
 Laudatio für Frau Professor Dr. phil. Erika Simon in Feier zur Verleihung des E.H. Vits-Preises 1983, 5–8, Tonio Hölscher.
 Kotinos: Festschrift für Erika Simon 1992.  von Zabern.

1927 births
2019 deaths
German archaeologists
German women archaeologists
20th-century German non-fiction writers
21st-century German non-fiction writers
20th-century German women writers
21st-century German women writers
Recipients of the Cross of the Order of Merit of the Federal Republic of Germany

Members of the American Philosophical Society